Otherworld is an American science fiction television series that aired for eight episodes from January 26 to March 16, 1985 on CBS and was created by Roderick Taylor. Taylor gave himself a cameo role in each episode. The series was later shown in reruns on the Sci Fi Channel.

Series overview
In the first episode, the Sterling family (Hal, June, Trace, Gina, Smith) take a tour of the interior of the Great Pyramid of Giza at the same time as a once-in-ten-thousand-years conjunction of the planets. Inside, they are abandoned by their guide, and as they try to get out, they are mysteriously transported to another planet which may or may not be in a parallel universe.

On this other planet (called 'Thel'), which is inhabited by humans, there are no familiar countries or states. The area they are in is divided up into self-contained "Zones," each with a wildly different style of government and way of life, although the province of "Imar" (ruled by a Praetor) appears to be the central seat of government for this entire Earth. Most of Thel's history is not revealed, although the pilot episode contains references to 'territories', android creators, and 'wars of unification'. It is thus unknown whether Thel is an alternate universe version of Earth, or another planet entirely.

Travel between Zones is so strictly regulated to the point that no one can travel outside their home zone province (save for the Zone troopers), and all maps have been banned by the state.  Thus, the inhabitants of each zone know absolutely nothing about life in other areas. The family could not know about the travel ban, and approach a soldier (the first Thel native they met) in all innocence, seeking help, while the soldier - Kommander Nuveen Kroll, reputed to be the worst, and most ill-tempered of all Zone Troopers - views them as lawbreakers and treats them as such. When Hal insists they need help, Kroll attempts to arrest them and gets rough with Smith, the youngest of the Sterling sons. The Sterlings resist and, in the struggle, Kroll's sidearm weapon goes off, and the ricocheting laserblast renders Kroll unconscious.  The Sterlings take his access crystal, (which is possessed only by Zone Trooper officers, and which gives them security access to state-controlled equipment and information data banks) his vehicle, and his sidearm and drive away. For the rest of the series, Kroll is resolute in his attempts to recover his crystal, capture the Sterlings (whom, in a report to his superior, he would later regard as a band of "armed terrorists") and subject them to severe punishment.

The Sterling family's first night in Thel is spent in a province called Sarlax. This province is an ages old mining colony where sophisticated androids labor at mining a radioactive mineral named "Sarlax". The mineral is just radioactive enough to make humans sick which necessitates the android labor force. The androids are sophisticated enough to have created a culture of their own and are related to the once ancient robots that ruled Thel in the past. It is here that a friendly android couple gives the Sterlings a historical book called The Book of Imar which chronicles the history of not just the planet but the androids and the culture of Thel.

The Church of Artificial Intelligence is the official state religion of Thel, and no conflicting ideologies are permitted. Very few actual details about this religion are known, except that it appears to be centered on the worship of robots, computers and cybernetic technology (adherents are, in one episode, said to use "Worship Modules" which are electronic in nature). There is mention in the first episode of a race of humans that created primitive robots and then died out. Eventually the robots evolved themselves through continued upgrades and modifications until they created what is known as a plasmoid being: an android that was a biomechanical equivalent of a true human in almost every aspect. These plasmoids were so in love with their creators that they even built in lifespans into their being so that they would be able to emulate death much like their onetime human masters. Eventually they began the process of recreating humans by a process that is not explained but once again Thel was populated by a majority of human lifeforms.

A series of Egyptian-like stone markers (Obelisks), each with one eye, are supposed to mark the way to Imar, a city with beautiful buildings and a suspension bridge (the city shown in the opening credits, apparently intended to be Imar, is a photographic negative of New York City).

Each episode has the family dealing with the bizarre ways of life in each "Zone," and at the end of the episode, fleeing one Zone for another, pursued by Commander Kroll (Jonathan Banks) and his Zone Troopers.  Kroll is intent on revenge, given that the Sterlings stole his high security access crystal, acquired during their disastrous encounter in the first episode.

Contact with Earth was evident by several references to Earth history:
 Nova tells Trace in the pilot episode ("Rules of Attraction") that there are 77 independent provinces. 
 References to Egyptian mythology abound, particularly in the signposts which the Sterlings use to attempt to find Imar; it was implied that the ancient Egyptians either had the ability to travel between universes, or had contact with a people that did. 
 The episode "Village of the Motorpigs" featured a retired Zone Trooper who shows the Sterlings a United States dollar and says that his grandfather came from Earth. 
It was also said that those that traveled from Thel to Earth used the pyramid and all-seeing-eye as a form of hidden message about the gateway to Thel.
 Another episode ("Princess Metra") takes place in a zone called Metraplex. The Zone's former leader, Kelly Bradford (since deceased), came from Earth; when seeing Gina, who resembles Kelly Bradford and wears a similar necklace made of an American half-dollar, they believe that Kelly Bradford has returned. Before appointing her the new leader, she is quizzed on Earth historical events by Metraplex officials - the quiz having been written by Kelly Bradford. In this episode, we learn that time passes at a different rate on Thel and Earth; Kelly is from Earth of the 1960s, yet her time on Thel was over 200 years ago.
 As mentioned, Imar appears to be the alternate universe's version of New York City, an image of which is used in the opening credits of the show to depict Imar.
A friendly android couple give the Sterlings a book containing the history of Thel called "The Book of Imar", which serves as a historical window on many of the provinces the Sterlings find themselves staying in.

Technology in Otherworld

Though Thel had many similarities to Earth of the 1980s, there was quite a bit of advanced technology displayed throughout the series. First, a state religion was the unifying ideology of the land. The Church of Artificial Intelligence, a rigid, computer based ideology without equal, the church wields powers of censorship, worship and could even put people to death in cases of heresy. The Church of Artificial Intelligence, however, may be just a means for the government to add one more measure of control to the everyday lives of the peoples of Thel.

Computational machines were advanced enough in Thel that certain facilities were maintained and monitored by artificial intelligences that substituted for human control when humans were busy with other concerns. For example, the Sarlicon brain was an ancient but artificially intelligent computer tasked with the safekeeping of the memories of the android population of Sarlax. The computer was subject to humans with high level access crystal keys but could defend itself from human attempts to circumvent the machine's operations. In Thel there also existed robot technology that allowed android design including androids so advanced they were indistinguishable from flesh and blood humans. These advanced androids are known as "Plasmoids" and they occupy the province of Sarlax serving as miners that can tolerate the minerals' radiation.

Access crystals were the method of securing high level databanks, travel, power sources and other high security areas of Thel. The crystal was basically a faceted glass appliance, several centimeters long, purplish in color, with a series of electronic chips and components inside. They are individually numbered and have the "mark of Imar" engraved on the bottom. Though not fully discussed in the series, it might have operated by being optically read or perhaps the electronics were of an RFID type. The crystal was read by a reader that simply allowed insertion of the crystal less than halfway into its interface shaft. A light would illuminate the crystal as it was being accessed and most readers were shown tied to computer terminals but in some cases they were freestanding units not unlike keyholes and used to secure doors. It was mentioned in the pilot that Kroll possessed a "class 1" access crystal, which is possibly the highest access class. What the lower class crystals' abilities were was never revealed.

It was mentioned in the episode "Metraplex" that advanced electronic entertainments known as "wave games" and "gratification intensifiers" existed. How these devices functioned was never revealed but it was also mentioned in the same episode that the province also produced "particle beam" weaponry had access to a "disintegration chamber" and subjugated an entire underclass population with "Vibratory Behavior Modification Modules". In another episode, weapons called "electrum bolts" are mentioned; they are supposedly deadly and exotic in what they do to living tissue.

The state soldiers, the Zone Troopers, are armed with a sidearm known as a "bioruptor". Bioruptors are sleek, black tubes with a rear-facing pistol grip at the butt end and are held with the barrel flipped from a natural pistol fashion with the trigger on top of the pistol grip. A single switch on the side of the bioruptor barrel serves as a "safety" to prevent accidental discharge. Though the devices could be quite deadly in the right hands, the weapons were capable of being adjusted from a light stun to a kill setting. The weapon's bright blue laser-like beams were said to affect the heart so they could be an electrical discharge type of weapon.

There also exists in Thel the ability for rudimentary holographic video which is used not only as entertainment but for education and telepresence communications. In the pilot episode we see a vehicle that sounds and looks like a hovercraft of some kind, however there also exists combustion engine technology as seen in the episode "Village of the Motor Pigs". Though it is suggested in the episode "Rock and Roll Suicide" that wind-powered turbines may exist (the father designed windmill blades) there is probably more than one source of energy available to the various provinces of Thel. In addition to these, we also were shown advanced biological research that could stop the aging process as well as weather control and shielding that can protect from laser storms.

Cast
 Hal Sterling (father) - Sam Groom
 June Sterling (mother) - Gretchen Corbett 
 Trace Sterling (teen son) - Tony O'Dell
 Gina Sterling (teen daughter) - Jonna Lee
 Smith Sterling (youngest child) was played by two different actors, Brandon Crane and Chris Hebert.  Crane played Smith in the pilot, which was aired as the first and fifth episodes.
 Kommander Nuveen Kroll - Jonathan Banks
 Lieutenant Zero, Kommander Kroll's aide - Wayne Alexander

Episodes

Syndication
The series was rerun on the USA Network, and re-shown several times on the Sci-Fi Channel. Otherworld was aired in the United Kingdom on the ITV network, except in the Thames/LWT region.

References

External links

 
John Kenneth Muir's Reflections on Film/TV
Television Obscurities - Otherworld

1985 American television series debuts
1985 American television series endings
1980s American science fiction television series
CBS original programming
English-language television shows
Television series by Universal Television
Television series about parallel universes
Television shows set in Egypt